Kızılöz is a village in the Samsat District of Adıyaman Province in Turkey. The village is populated by Kurds of the Bezikan tribe and had a population of 77 in 2021.

References

Villages in Samsat District
Kurdish settlements in Adıyaman Province